Fourche Creek may refer to:

 Fourche Creek (Arkansas), a watershed and stream in the state of Arkansas 
 Fourche Creek (Missouri), a stream in Ripley County, Missouri 
 Fourche Creek (Wisconsin),  a stream in Iron County, Wisconsin 
 Fourche Creek (Oklahoma),   a stream in Carter County, Oklahoma